Bernard Gibbs (1899–1963) was an Irish hurler who played as a left corner-forward for the Galway senior team. 

Gibbs made his first appearance for the team during the 1923 championship and was a regular member of the team until his emigration prior to the start of the 1925 championship. During that time he won one All-Ireland medal. Gibbs was an All-Ireland runner-up on one occasion.

Gibbs also enjoyed a brief club career with Gort.

Playing career

Club

Gibbs played his club hurling with Gort, however, he enjoyed little success during his brief career.

Inter-county

Gibbs first came to prominence on the inter-county scene with Galway during their first breakthrough in the 1920s. In 1923 he was a key member of the team as Galway qualified for their first All-Ireland final in thirty-six years. After beating reigning champions Kilkenny at the penultimate stage, Galway now faced Limerick who were bidding for a third All-Ireland title in seven years. A high-scoring game developed, however, at half-time the sides were level. A hat-trick of goals by Leonard McGrath and powerful displays by Mick Gill and Mick Derivan helped Galway to a 7–3 to 4–5 victory. It was a first All-Ireland medal for Gibbs.

Gibbs played in a second successive All-Ireland decider in 1924 with Dublin providing the opposition. Galway played with the wind in the first-half and led by three points at the break. Two goals by Dublin forward Garrett Howard and a great goalkeeping display by Tommy Daly ensured a 5–3 to 2–6 defeat for Galway.

International

In 1924 Gibbs was honoured when he was chosen on the Ireland hurling team for the Tailteann Games competition.

References

1899 births
1963 deaths
Gort hurlers
Galway inter-county hurlers
All-Ireland Senior Hurling Championship winners